The Colonial Coast Rugby Conference is a New England-based college rugby conference founded in 2012.  The conference provides a pathway to the National Small College Rugby Organization National Championship for Division 3 college rugby programs.

In addition, the conference provides a pathway for women's rugby to compete in the National Collegiate Rugby national championships.

Membership 
The following schools are members of the Conference:

 Salve Regina University, Newport, RI
 Endicott College, Beverly, MA
 Massachusetts Maritime Academy, Buzzards Bay, MA
 Wentworth Institute of Technology, Boston, MA
 Wheaton College, Norton, MA
 Johnson & Wales University, Providence, RI
 Plymouth State University, Plymouth, NH
 Bryant University, Smithfield, RI
 Roger Williams University, Bristol, RI
 University of Massachusetts Dartmouth, Dartmouth, MA

Championship History 
2021 - Endicott College, Beverly, MA
2020 - Did not play
2019 - Salve Regina University, Newport, RI
2018 - Endicott College, Beverly, MA
2017 - Salve Regina University, Newport, RI
2016 - Plymouth State University, Plymouth, NH
2015 - Salve Regina University, Newport, RI
2014 - Roger Williams University, Bristol, RI
2013 - Salve Regina University, Newport, RI
2012 - Salve Regina University, Newport, RI

References

External links
 

College rugby conferences in the United States
National Small College Rugby Organization
2012 establishments in the United States